The Anti-Corruption Commission of Namibia (ACC) is an agency of the executive branch of the Government of Namibia. It was established under section 2 of the Anti-Corruption Act 8 of 2003 and inaugurated on 1 February 2006 by president Hifikepunye Pohamba. The aim of the commission is to fight against corruption.

Corruption is high in Namibia, i.e. unofficial but necessary bribe for receiving work permit in Namibia Investment Centre (as they are responsible for such decisions) is about N$10000. The Anti-Corruption Act is Namibia's primary anti-corruption law, covering passive bribery, active bribery, attempted corruption, extortion and bribing a foreign public official.

Management
Upon its formation and inauguration Monica Nashandi was appointed as Director and Advocate EL van der Merwe as Deputy Director.

References

External links
 ACC Official Website
 Corruption Profile Namibia from the Business-Anti-Corruption Portal

Government of Namibia
Anti-corruption agencies